Quercus phanera is an uncommon Asian species of tree in the beech family. It has been found only in the Provinces of Guangxi and Hainan in southern China. It is placed in subgenus Cerris, section Cyclobalanopsis.

Quercus phanera is a tree up to 25 meters tall. Twigs are grayish brown. Leaves can be as much as 15 cm long.

References

External links
line drawing, Flora of China Illustrations vol. 4, fig. 387, drawings 1-4 at top

phanera
Flora of Guangxi
Flora of Hainan
Plants described in 1947